Roman Sitko (30 March 1880 – 12 October 1942) was a Polish Catholic priest. In 1941 he was arrested by the Nazis and murdered at Auschwitz-Birkenau concentration camp. He is considered a martyr and was beatified by Pope John Paul II on 13 June 1999.

Life
Roman Sitko was born on 30 March 1880 in Czarna Sędziszowska, Poland. In 1900 he started his studies for the priesthood and was ordained in Tarnów in 1904. Between 1907 and 1921 he worked as a priest in Mielec.

Sitko was arrested on 22 May 1941 by the Nazis. He was imprisoned for months before being sent to Auschwitz-Birkenau in August 1942.

Veneration
After his murder Sitko was recognized as one of the 108 Martyrs of World War II. He was beatified by Pope John Paul II on 13 June 1999. His feast is celebrated on 12 October.

In 2014 a documentary was shot by a Polish screenplay writer, director and film producer Dawid Szpara.

Further reading 
 Adam Nowak, Ksiądz rektor Roman Sitko. Życie, działalność, męczeństwo, Wydawnictwo Diecezji Tarnowskiej BIBLOS, Tarnów 1998, . (in Polish)
 Stanisław Sojka, Męczennicy 1939—1945. Błogosławiony ks. Roman Sitko, Zeszyt 45, Wydawnictwo Duszpasterstwa Rolników, Włocławek 2001, .  (in Polish)
 Krzysztof G. Gucwa, Bardzo szanowany rektor. Numer 61908 z KL Auschwitz, Wydawca JAMAKASZ, Tarnów 2014, .  (in Polish)

See also 
 List of saints of Poland
 List of saints canonized by Pope John Paul II

References

External links 
 Beato Romano (Roman) Sitko

1880 births
1942 deaths
20th-century Polish Roman Catholic priests
108 Blessed Polish Martyrs
Polish people who died in Auschwitz concentration camp